A behavior-shaping constraint, also sometimes referred to as a forcing function or poka-yoke, is a technique used in error-tolerant design to prevent the user from making common errors or mistakes.  One example is the reverse lockout on the transmission of a moving automobile.

The microwave oven provides another example of a forcing function.  In all modern microwave ovens, it is impossible to start the microwave while the door is still open.  Likewise, the microwave will shut off automatically if the door is opened by the user.  By forcing the user to close the microwave door while it is in use, it becomes impossible for the user to err by leaving the door open.  Forcing functions are very effective in safety critical situations such as this, but can cause confusion in more complex systems that do not inform the user of the error that has been made.

When automobiles first started shipping with on-board GPS systems, it was not uncommon to use a forcing function which prevented the user from interacting with the GPS (such as entering in a destination) while the car was in motion.  This ensures that the driver's attention is not distracted by the GPS.  However, many drivers found this feature irksome, and the forcing function has largely been abandoned.  This reinforces the idea that forcing functions are not always the best approach to shaping behavior.

These forcing functions are being used in the service industry as well.  Call centers concerned with credit card fraud and friendly fraud are using agent-assisted automation to prevent the agent from seeing or hearing the credit card information so that it cannot be stolen.  The customer punches the information into their phone keypad, the tones are masked to the agent and are not visible in the customer relationship management software.

References

External links
A paper that includes the concept
Architectures of Control in Design, a site looking at constraints in the design of products, systems and environments

Engineering concepts
Human behavior